The NOAA Ship Delaware II (R 445) is a National Oceanic and Atmospheric Administration (NOAA) fisheries research vessel that was in commission from 1970 to 2012. Prior to her NOAA career, she was in commission in the United States Fish and Wildlife Services Bureau of Commercial Fisheries from 1968 to 1970 as BCF Delaware II.

Characteristics and capabilities 
The mess room can seat 16 for meals. She carried a crew of 18, consisting of a licensed master, a chief mate, three NOAA Corps officers, three licensed engineers, and 10 other crew members. In addition, she can accommodate up to 14 scientists.

Delaware IIs deck equipment features five winches, one boom crane, two A-frames, and a movable gantry. Each of the winches serves a specialized function ranging from trawling to hydrographic surveys.

In support of her primary mission of fishery and living marine resource research for the National Marine Fisheries Service (NMFS) division of NOAA, the ship has echo sounders and an acoustic doppler current profiler (ADCP). Additional scientific equipment includes a thermosalinograph; a conductivity, temperature, and depth profiler; three hull-mounted sea-surface temperature probes, and a fluorometer. She has  of laboratory space with a wet laboratory and a dry/chemistry laboratory. She also has a 201-cubic-foot (5.7-cubic-metre) walk-in freezer. She carries an  rigid hull inflatable boat for utility use and rescue operations.

Construction and service history 
Delaware II was built at South Portland Engineering in South Portland, Maine. She was launched in December 1967 and commissioned in October 1968 into service with the Fish and Wildlife Services Bureau of Commercial Fisheries as BCF Delaware II. When NOAA was established on 3 October 1970, she became part of NOAAs fleet as NOAAS Delaware II (R 445).

Based at Woods Hole, Massachusetts, and operated by NOAAs Office of Marine and Aviation Operations, Delaware II conducted fishery research in support of NMFSs Northeast Fisheries Science Centers (NEFSC) Woods Hole Laboratory. She normally operated in the Gulf of Maine, on the Georges Bank, and on the continental shelf and continental slope from southern New England to Cape Hatteras, North Carolina. Typical assessment work included groundfish assessment surveys and marine resources monitoring, assessment, and prediction (MARMAP) surveys. Research conducted from Delaware II sought to understand the physical and biological processes that control year-class strength of key, economically important fish species.

NOAA refurbished and renovated the vessel in the early 2000s, eventually decommissioning the vessel Delaware II on 28 September 2012 and placed her in reserve.

In 2014, Delaware II was renamed Med Surveyor, where the vessel underwent a total transformation into a modern survey vessel with the addition of a hull mounted multibeam system, the addition of an array of survey equipment along with other significant modernizations to machinery, electronics and other. She is currently active supporting cable route surveys for subsea cable systems around the globe.

See also
 NOAA ships and aircraft

References

External links

 
 NOAA Ship Delaware II
Prézelin, Bernard, and A. D. Baker III, eds. The Naval Institute Guide to Combat Fleets of the World 1990/1991: Their Ships, Aircraft, and Armament. Annapolis, Maryland: United States Naval Institute, 1990. .

Ships of the National Oceanic and Atmospheric Administration
Ships of the United States Fish and Wildlife Service
Ships built in Portland, Maine
1967 ships
Delaware-related ships